Arrow Rock Historic District is a National Historic Landmark District encompassing the village of Arrow Rock, Missouri and the adjacent Arrow Rock State Historic Site.  The Arrow Rock area was where the historic Santa Fe Trail crossed the Missouri River, and was thus a key stopping point during the settlement of the American West.  The  historic district was declared a National Historic Landmark in 1963.

Description and history

Arrow Rock is named for a stone formation that has been a recognized landmark on the Missouri River since the 18th century, supposedly prized by local Native Americans as a source of stone for tools and weapons.  A ferry was established in the area in 1815, providing westward access to settlers passing through Franklin on the eastern bank.  In the 1820s this route became known as the Santa Fe Trail, and became a major route by which settlers traveled west.  The town of Arrow Rock provided services to these travelers, with a tavern (the still -standing 1834 J. Huston Tavern) and a fresh-water spring among the amenities.  By the mid-19th century the town had a population of 1,000.  As the trail declined in importance, so did the town's population.

Since 1912, Arrow Rock has transformed from a small river town into a major heritage-tourism center thanks to an active historic preservation movement. In 1963 it was recognized as a National Historic Landmark site, in 2006 the National Trust for Historic Preservation listed it as one of its "Dozen Distinctive Destination" sites, and in 2008 it was recognized as a "Preserve America Community." For most of the 20th century, preservation and interpretation activities focused almost exclusively on the upscale white, male components, ignoring the role of the majority population. Beginning in 1996, Arrow Rock redefined has utilized public history and archaeology to emphasize new interpretive programs that Pay much more attention to the African American heritage. Preservationists and historians are eager to involve this previously marginalized descendant community.

The historic district includes both the incorporated village of Arrow Rock, and the grounds of the adjacent state historic site, which partly overlap each other.  The village includes a significant number of surviving pre-Civil War buildings, including the tavern, a courthouse, jail, and several churches.  Within the bounds of the state park is the George Caleb Bingham House, a modest brick structure (now restored) that was the home of frontier artist George Caleb Bingham.

See also
List of National Historic Landmarks in Missouri
National Register of Historic Places listings in Saline County, Missouri

References

Further reading
 Baumann, Timothy E. "An Historical Perspective of Civic Engagement and Interpreting Cultural Diversity in Arrow Rock, Missouri." Historical Archaeology (2011): 114-134. online

External links

All of the following Historic American Buildings Survey (HABS) documentation is filed under Arrow Rock, Saline County, MO:

Historic districts on the National Register of Historic Places in Missouri
National Historic Landmarks in Missouri
Historic American Buildings Survey in Missouri
Geography of Saline County, Missouri
National Register of Historic Places in Saline County, Missouri
Santa Fe Trail